A perinate is a member of a viviparous species from approximately one month before birth to one month after it.

See also
 Fetus
 Neonate
 Prenatal and perinatal psychology

Neonatology